Chain termination is any chemical reaction that ceases the formation of reactive intermediates in a chain propagation step in the course of a polymerization, effectively bringing it to a halt.

Mechanisms of termination 

In polymer chemistry, there are several mechanisms by which a polymerization reaction can terminate depending on the mechanism and circumstances of the reaction. A method of termination that applies to all polymer reactions is the depletion of monomer. In chain growth polymerization, two growing chains can collide head to head causing the growth of both of the chains to stop. In the case of radical or anionic polymerization, chain transfer can occur where the radical at the end of the growing chain can be transferred from the chain to an individual monomer unit causing a new chain to start growing and the previous chain to stop growing. With step-growth polymerization, the reaction can be terminated by adding a monofunctional species containing the same functionality as one or more of the types of monomer used in the reaction. For example, an alcohol R'-OH can be used to stop a reaction between a polyisocyanate and a polyol because it will react with the isocyanate functionality R-N=C=O to produce R-(N-H)-(C=O)-O-R' which is then no longer reactive with the polyol.

Termination of radical polymerization 
The termination steps of free radical polymerization steps are of two types: recombination and disproportionation. In a recombination step, two growing chain radicals form a covalent bond in a single stable molecule. For the example of a vinyl polymer, 

-------CH2–C°HX  +  -------CH2–C°HX  →  -------CH2–CHX–CHX–CH2-------
Termination by recombination increases the chain length and therefore the molecular weight of the final polymer.

In a disproportionation step, one radical transfers a hydrogen atom to the other to form two stable molecules:

-------CH2–C°HX  +  -------CH2–C°HX  →  -------CH2–CHX  +  -------CH=CHX
Termination by disproportionation usually has a higher activation energy since it involves breaking of one bond, and therefore is more important at higher energy.

References

External links
 IUPAC Gold Book definition: Termination

Polymer chemistry